The 2019 Epsom and Ewell Borough Council election took place on 2 May 2019 to elect members of Epsom and Ewell Borough Council. This was on the same day as other local elections. The entire council (38 seats) was up for election. The result was a gain for the incumbent Residents Associations of Epsom and Ewell, gaining 2 seats from the Conservatives but losing 1 to them as well. The Liberal Democrats regained representation on the council, gaining 2 seats from the Conservatives.

Results

|}

The Residents Associations of Epsom and Ewell consists of:
 College Ward Residents' Association 
 Cuddington Residents' Association 
 Epsom Town Residents' Association 
 Ewell Court Residents' Association 
 Association of Ewell Downs Residents 
 Ewell Village Residents' Association
 Nonsuch Park & District Residents' Association
 Stamford Ward Residents' Association
 Stoneleigh and Auriol Residents' Association
 West Ewell and Ruxley Residents' Association
 Woodcote Epsom Residents' Society

Results by ward

Auriol

College

Court

Cuddington

Ewell

Ewell Court

Nonsuch

Ruxley

Stamford

Stoneleigh

Town

West Ewell

Woodcote

References

Epsom and Ewell
Epsom and Ewell Borough Council elections